In geometry, a unital is a set of n3 + 1 points arranged into subsets of size n + 1 so that every pair of distinct points of the set are contained in exactly one subset. This is equivalent to saying that a unital is a 2-(n3 + 1, n + 1, 1) block design. Some unitals may be embedded in a projective plane of order n2 (the subsets of the design become sets of collinear points in the projective plane). In this case of embedded unitals, every line of the plane intersects the unital in either 1 or n + 1 points. In the Desarguesian planes, PG(2,q2), the classical examples of unitals are given by nondegenerate Hermitian curves. There are also many non-classical examples. The first and the only known unital with non prime power parameters, n=6, was constructed by Bhaskar Bagchi and Sunanda Bagchi. It is still unknown if this unital can be embedded in a projective plane of order 36, if such a plane exists.

Classical unitals
We review some terminology used in projective geometry.

A correlation of a projective geometry is a bijection on its subspaces that reverses containment. In particular, a correlation interchanges points and hyperplanes.

A correlation of order two is called a polarity.

A polarity is called a unitary polarity if its associated sesquilinear form s with companion automorphism α satisfies
 s(u,v) = s(v,u)α for all vectors u, v of the underlying vector space.

A point is called an absolute point of a polarity if it lies on the image of itself under the polarity.

The absolute points of a unitary polarity of the projective geometry PG(d,F), for some d ≥ 2, is a nondegenerate Hermitian variety, and if d = 2 this variety is called a nondegenerate Hermitian curve.

In PG(2,q2) for some prime power q, the set of points of a nondegenerate Hermitian curve form a unital, which is called a classical unital.

As all nondegenerate Hermitian curves in the same plane are projectively equivalent,  can be described in terms of homogeneous coordinates as follows:

Ree unitals
Another family of unitals based on Ree groups was constructed by H. Lüneburg. Let Γ = R(q) be the Ree group of type 2G2 of order (q3 + 1)q3(q − 1) where q = 32m+1. Let P be the set of all q3 + 1 Sylow 3-subgroups of Γ. Γ acts doubly transitively on this set by conjugation (it will be convenient to think of these subgroups as points that Γ is acting on.) For any S and T in P, the pointwise stabilizer, ΓS,T is cyclic of order q - 1, and thus contains a unique involution, μ. Each such involution fixes exactly q + 1 points of P. Construct a block design on the points of P whose blocks are the fixed point sets of these various involutions μ. Since Γ acts doubly transitively on P, this will be a 2-design with parameters 2-(q3 + 1, q + 1, 1) called a Ree unital.

Lüneburg also showed that the Ree unitals can not be embedded in projective planes of order q2 (Desarguesian or not) such that the automorphism group Γ is induced by a collineation group of the plane. For q = 3, Grüning proved that a Ree unital can not be embedded in any projective plane of order 9.

Buekenhout's Constructions 
Metz subsequently showed that one of Buekenhout's constructions actually yields non-classical unitals in all finite Desarguesian planes of square order at least 9. These Buekenhout-Metz unitals have been extensively studied.

In the ovoidal cone case, this forced intersection consists of a single line, and any spread can be mapped onto a spread containing this line, showing that every translation plane of this form admits an embedded unital.

Unitals with 
In the four projective planes of order 9 (the Desarguesian plane PG(2,9), the Hall plane of order 9, the dual Hall plane of order 9 and the Hughes plane of order 9.), an exhaustive computer search by Penttila and Royle found 18 unitals (up to equivalence) with n = 3 in these four planes: two in PG(2,9) (both Buekenhout), four in the Hall plane (two Buekenhout, two not), and so another four in the dual Hall plane, and eight in the Hughes plane. However, one of the Buekenhout unitals in the Hall plane is self-dual, and thus gets counted again in the dual Hall plane. Thus, there are 17 distinct embeddable unitals with n = 3. On the other hand, a nonexhaustive computer search found over 900 mutually nonisomorphic designs which are unitals with n = 3.

Isomorphic versus equivalent unitals
Since unitals are block designs, two unitals are said to be isomorphic if there is a design isomorphism between them, that is, a bijection between the point sets which maps blocks to blocks. This concept does not take into account the property of embeddability, so to do so we say that two unitals, embedded in the same ambient plane, are equivalent if there is a collineation of the plane which maps one unital to the other.

Notes

Citations

Sources

Combinatorial design
Finite geometry
Incidence geometry
Projective geometry